Timothy J. Keller (born September 23, 1950) is an American pastor, theologian, and Christian apologist. He is the chairman and co-founder of Redeemer City to City, which trains pastors for service around the world. He is also the founding pastor of Redeemer Presbyterian Church in New York City, New York and the author of The New York Times bestselling books The Prodigal God: Recovering the Heart of the Christian Faith (2008), Prayer: Experiencing Awe and Intimacy with God (2014), and The Reason for God: Belief in an Age of Skepticism (2008). The prequel for the latter is Making Sense of GOD: An Invitation to the Skeptical (2016).

Early life and education
Keller was born in Allentown, Pennsylvania, to Louise A. Keller (Clemente) and William B. Keller, a television advertising manager. Keller is a graduate of Bucknell University (BA, 1972), Gordon-Conwell Theological Seminary (M.Div., 1975) and Westminster Theological Seminary, where he received his D.Min. in 1981, under the supervision of Harvie M. Conn. Although he nominally grew up in the Lutheran Church in America, he officially became a Christian on his own accord while at Bucknell University, due to the ministry of InterVarsity Christian Fellowship, with which he later served as a staff member. He was ordained by the Presbyterian Church in America (PCA) and served as a pastor at West Hopewell Presbyterian Church in Hopewell, Virginia for nine years, while serving as director of church planting for the PCA. He also served on the faculty of Westminster Theological Seminary, in Philadelphia, Pennsylvania, where he and his wife Kathy Keller were involved in urban ministry.

Career
Keller was recruited by his denomination to start Redeemer Presbyterian Church in Manhattan in 1989 despite his relative lack of experience after two others had turned down the position. By 2017 when Dr Keller stepped out of the pulpit ministry over 5,000 people a week attended.

In 2008, Keller published his first book since his 1989 report to his denomination on diaconal ministries, Ministries of Mercy. The book, The Reason for God, was based on common objections to the Christian faith heard during his ministry in New York City. The book reached seventh on the New York Times Nonfiction bestseller list.

Redeemer Presbyterian Church
Redeemer Presbyterian Church grew from 50 people to a total attendance of over 5,000 people each Sunday as of 2008, leading some to call him "the most successful Christian evangelist in the city". In 2004, Christianity Today praised Redeemer as "one of Manhattan's most vital congregations".

The church's emphasis on young urban professionals, whom Keller believes exhibit disproportionate influence over the culture and its ideas, has given the church an unusual makeup for a US megachurch. The majority of the congregation is made up of single adults; it is also over forty percent Asian-American, and has many congregants working in the arts and financial services. In his preaching, "he hardly shrinks from difficult Christian truths, [but] he sounds different from many of the shrill evangelical voices in the public sphere." Keller often critiques both political parties and avoids taking public stances on political issues, resulting in a politically centrist church.

Redeemer Presbyterian Church has also founded Hope for New York, a non-profit organization that sends volunteers and grants to over 40 faith-based ministries serving social needs in New York City, the Center for Faith and Work to train professionals in Christian theology, and Redeemer City to City to train and fund pastors in New York and other cities.

Keller is a co-founder of The Gospel Coalition, a group of Reformed leaders from around the United States. His mentoring of younger church leaders, such as Scott Sauls in Nashville and Steve Chong in Sydney, has increased his influence globally.

On July 1, 2017, Keller stepped down from his role as senior pastor of Redeemer Presbyterian Church. The move was part of a larger vision to shift his efforts from preaching to training the next generation of church leaders and starting new churches in global cities through Redeemer City to City.

Theological views
Keller shuns the label "evangelical" because of its political and fundamentalist connotation, preferring to call himself orthodox because "he believes in the importance of personal conversion or being 'born again,' and the full authority of the Bible." He identifies with Calvinist theology, although he has been critiqued by some in that tradition for his modern interpretation of its doctrines. He has been described as a "doctrine-friendly emerging pastor" and a "neo-Calvinist."

Gospel versus religion
The centerpiece and underpinning of Keller's ministry has been his teaching of the doctrine of the gospel, emphasizing the doctrines of total depravity, unmerited grace and substitutionary atonement. This teaching is summarized in his oft-used explanation, "The gospel is this: We are more sinful and flawed in ourselves than we ever dared believe, yet at the very same time we are more loved and accepted in Jesus Christ than we ever dared hope.” This understanding of the gospel is contrasted to what Keller calls “traditional religion” (which he defines as a set of rules, rituals or actions that enable an individual to earn salvation or favor with God) as well as “irreligion” (which he defines as the belief that there is no God or no need for his favor). This has been referred to as a “gospel third way,” or “gospel-centered” approach. Typical of this teaching is his interpretation of the Parable of the Prodigal Son (see The Prodigal God), based on a teaching of one of Keller's mentors, Edmund Clowney.

Apologetics
Keller's preaching and writing in his apologetics is characterized by a respectful orientation towards an educated and skeptical audience outside the faith. His most explicit work on the subject is The Reason for God which he attributes to thousands of conversations with skeptical New Yorkers over the course of his ministry (Reason, xix). Elsewhere he has written about the loss of a Christian culture in the West, including in the academic and cultural establishments, and the need for Christians to contextualize to the current secular and anti-religious cultural climate.

On creationism, Keller states that his view is not strictly literal and that evolution is "neither ruled in nor ruled out" in his church. Keller has written on the topic for the Biologos Foundation.

Keller's major influences in apologetics include C.S. Lewis, Cornelius Van Til, John Stott, Alvin Plantinga and Miroslav Volf.

Idolatry
Another central theme in Keller's teaching is idolatry, as based on teachings of Martin Luther and John Calvin, and on the Ten Commandments and other parts of the Bible. Keller states that contemporary idol worship continues today in the form of an addiction or devotion to money, career, sex, power and anything people seek to give significance and satisfaction in life other than God (detailed in his book Counterfeit Gods).

Social justice and politics
Keller disavows the "Social Gospel" that has characterized Mainline Protestant churches, which advocates liberal political causes and de-emphasizes the doctrines of sin and substitutionary sacrifice. However he has also criticized the evangelical alliance with Republicans and argued that Christianity is a much broader global movement that agrees with some liberal and some conservative issues (and critiques them both). He has argued for giving to charitable causes and caring for the needs of the poor based on biblical texts such as the Torah and the Parable of the Good Samaritan.

Cultural engagement
Attributed partly to his congregation of upwardly mobile Manhattanites, Keller has been a leader in applying Christian theology to secular vocations such as business, art and entrepreneurship. The Center for Faith and Work at Redeemer has sponsored business competitions and theological education for working professionals. His views on Christianity and culture are outlined in his books Every Good Endeavor and Center Church.
Keller is an avid fan of the work of C.S. Lewis and J.R.R. Tolkien, both well-known Christian authors, and also supports the Harry Potter novels which have been considered pagan by certain conservative Christians.

Sex and gender
Keller has a complementarian view of gender that believes that the Bible teaches defined roles for both genders, but the specific duties accompanying each gender's role is undefined. He believes that "Marriage provides the personal growth that comes through cross-gender relationships." He elaborates on the biblical view of sex and marriage in his book The Meaning of Marriage and believes homosexual sexual behavior is inconsistent with scripture. Keller is a signatory of the Manhattan Declaration and is opposed to abortion, but is not opposed to contraception.

Cities and urban church planting
While at Westminster Theological Seminary, Keller was mentored by Harvie Conn, an early advocate of ministry in urban centers, and was recruited to start Redeemer Presbyterian Church due to a shortage of biblically orthodox churches in center-city Manhattan.

He has since become a worldwide spokesman for the need to create new kinds of churches in urban centers to address rapid urbanization. He delivered a plenary address on the subject at the Lausanne Conference of 2010.

Through Redeemer City to City, Keller mentors and chairs a network of center-city churches that represents similar ministry values worldwide. He writes extensively on the importance of cities and gives a biblical theological framework for ministry in cities in his book on ministry, Center Church.

Personal life
Keller currently resides on Roosevelt Island in New York City with his wife, Kathy. The Kellers have three sons, David, Michael, and Jonathan.

In June 2020, Keller revealed that he was diagnosed with pancreatic cancer.

Books
 Resources for Deacons: Love Expressed through Mercy Ministries (Christian Education and Publications, 1985) 
 Ministries of Mercy: The Call of the Jericho Road (P&R Publishing, 1997) 
 Church Planter Manual (Redeemer Presbyterian Church, 2002)
 The Reason for God: Belief in an Age of Skepticism (Dutton Adult, February 2008) 
 The Prodigal God: Recovering the Heart of the Christian Faith (Dutton Adult, November 2008) 
 Counterfeit Gods: The Empty Promises of Money, Sex, and Power, and the Only Hope that Matters (Dutton Adult, October 2009) 
Generous Justice: How God's Grace Makes Us Just (Dutton Adult, November 2010) 
King's Cross: The Story of the World in the Life of Jesus (Dutton Adult, February 2011) 
The Meaning of Marriage: Facing the Complexities of Commitment with the Wisdom of God (Dutton Adult, November 2011) 
The Freedom of Self Forgetfulness: The Path to True Christian Joy (10Publishing, March 2012) 
Center Church: Doing Balanced, Gospel-Centered Ministry in Your City (Zondervan, September 2012) 
Every Good Endeavor: Connecting Your Work to God's Work (Dutton, November 2012) 
Galatians For You (The Good Book Company, February 2013) 
Judges For You (The Good Book Company, August 2013) 
Walking with God through Pain and Suffering (Dutton, October 2013) 
Encounters with Jesus: Unexpected Answers to Life's Biggest Questions (Dutton, 2013) 
Romans 1-7 For You (The Good Book Company, February 2014) 
Prayer: Experiencing Awe and Intimacy with God (Dutton, 2014) 
Center Church Europe (Wijnen, Uitgeverij Van, 2014) Contributors are José de Segovia, Leonardo De Chirico, Michael Herbst, Frank Hinkelmann, Martin de Jong, Jens Bruun Kofoed, Daniel Liechti, András Lovas, David Novak, Stefan Paas and Martin Reppenhagen. 
Romans 8-16 For You (The Good Book Company, February 2015) 
Preaching: Communicating Faith in an Age of Skepticism (Viking, June 2015) 
The Songs of Jesus: A Year of Daily Devotionals in the Psalms (Viking, November 2015) 
Making Sense of GOD: An Invitation to the Skeptical Viking  ebk. 
Hidden Christmas: The Surprising Truth Behind the Birth of Christ (Viking, Nov 2016) 
God's Wisdom for Navigating Life: A Year of Daily Devotions in the Book of Proverbs (Viking, Nov 2017) 
The Prodigal Prophet: Jonah and the Mystery of God's Mercy (Viking, Oct 2018) 
The Meaning of Marriage: A Couple's Devotional: A Year of Daily Devotions (Viking, Nov 2019) 
How to Reach the West Again (Redeemer City to City, 2020) 
On Birth (Penguin Books, 2020) 
On Marriage (Penguin Books, 2020) 
On Death (Penguin Books, 2020) 
Hope in Times of Fear: The Resurrection and the Meaning of Easter (Viking, March 9, 2021) 
Forgive: Why Should I and How Can I? (Viking, Nov 1, 2022)

Contributions in edited volumes 
 
 .
 
 .
 .
 .
 
 
 .

Interviews
 Amanpour, Christiane (2011). Interview with Pastor Tim Keller, ABC News This Week, April 24. 
 Barkhorn, Eleanor (2011), "How Timothy Keller Spreads the Gospel in New York City, and Beyond" The Atlantic, Feb 21, 2011.  
 Bechelder, Kate (2014), "God Isn’t Dead in Gotham" Wall Street Journal, Dec 20-21, 2014.
 Kristof, Nicholas (2016). "Pastor, Am I a Christian?" New York Times, December 25, p. SR19.
 Wehner, Peter (2019). "The Moral Universe of Timothy Keller" The Atlantic, Dec 5, 2019.
 Lee, Sophia (2021). "Pastoring the City" World Magazine, Dec 9, 2021.
 Bobrow, Emily (2022). "Pastor Timothy Keller Speaks to the Head and the Heart" Wall Street Journal, Sep 2, 2022.

References

 Carnes, Tony (December 2004). "New York's New Hope". Christianity Today. Retrieved 2007-03-28.

External links

1950 births
Presbyterian Church in America ministers
Religious leaders from New York City
Living people
Westminster Theological Seminary alumni
Westminster Theological Seminary faculty
Bucknell University alumni
Gordon–Conwell Theological Seminary alumni
Religious leaders from Allentown, Pennsylvania
Christian apologists
American Calvinist and Reformed theologians
20th-century Calvinist and Reformed theologians
21st-century Calvinist and Reformed theologians
21st-century Calvinist and Reformed ministers
21st-century Christians
Critics of atheism